The International Journal of Intelligence and CounterIntelligence is a quarterly academic journal about intelligence and responses to intelligence activities. All articles submitted to this journal undergo editorial screening and review. The journal was established in 1986 and is published by Routledge. The editor-in-chief is Dr. Jan Goldman (The Citadel, Military College of South Carolina ).

Abstracting and indexing 
The journal is abstracted and indexed in  EBSCO databases and Scopus.

References

External links 
 

Taylor & Francis academic journals
Publications established in 1986
English-language journals
Political science journals
Quarterly journals
Military journals
Non-fiction works about espionage